Boron triiodide is a chemical compound of boron and iodine with chemical formula BI3. It has a trigonal planar molecular geometry. It is a crystalline solid, which reacts vigorously with water to form hydroiodic acid and boric acid. Its dielectric constant is 5.38 and its heat of vaporization is 40.5 kJ/mol. At extremely high pressures, BI3 becomes metallic at ~23 GPa and is a superconductor above ~27 GPa.

Preparation
Boron triiodide can be prepared by the reaction of boron with iodine at 209.5 °C or 409.1 °F.
It can also be prepared by this other method: {3HI} + BCl3 -> {BI3} + 3HCl (this reaction requires high temperature).

References

External links
MSDS (link is broken)

Boron compounds
Iodides
Boron halides